Brunswick Old Town Historic District is a historic district in Brunswick, Georgia. It was added to the National Register of Historic Places on April 26, 1979 and includes an area bounded by 1st Street, Bay Street, New Bay Street, H Street, and Cochran Street (4th Ave. and G St., according to one source). Brunswick is one of Georgia's two deep-water ports and is the mainland city associated with the Golden Isles of Georgia, at the junction of I-95 and US 82.

The historic district includes the site of the colonial British town of Brunswick, named after the family of King George III of Great Britain. Formed in 1771, it retains its original grid plan (as does Savannah, Georgia). The district has 19th century residential and public buildings including the Hazelhurst-Taylor House in Hanover Square, the Mahoney-McGarvey House on Reynolds Street, and the Old Brunswick City Hall. Some of the sidewalks use hexagonal stone tiles.

Photo gallery

See also

National Register of Historic Places listings in Glynn County, Georgia

References

Queen Anne architecture in Georgia (U.S. state)
Buildings and structures completed in 1885
Brunswick, Georgia
Historic districts on the National Register of Historic Places in Georgia (U.S. state)
National Register of Historic Places in Glynn County, Georgia